John Whitcombe, D.D. was an Anglican bishop in Ireland in the 18th century.

Whitcombe was educated at Trinity College, Dublin after which he became Chaplain to the Duke of Dorset then Rector of Louth.  He was consecrated Bishop of Clonfert and Kilmacduagh in January 1735; and was also appointed in commendam to Kilfenora in 1742.  In 1752 he was  translated to Down and Connor and finally to the Archbishopric of Cashel later that year.

He died on 22 September 1753.

References

Fellows of Trinity College Dublin
Bishops of Clonfert and Kilmacduagh
Bishops of Kilfenora (Church of Ireland)
Bishops of Down and Connor (Church of Ireland)
Anglican archbishops of Cashel
1753 deaths
Members of the Irish House of Lords
Irish Anglican archbishops